Frederic Gordon Foster (24 February 1921 – 20 December 2010) was an Irish computational engineer, statistician, professor, and college dean who is widely known for devising, in 1965, a nine-digit code upon which the International Standard Book Number (ISBN) is based.

Life 
Foster was born in Belfast, United Kingdom of Great Britain and Ireland, between 1920 enactment and 1921 implementation of the partition of Ireland. He studied at the Royal Belfast Academical Institution and began advanced study in mathematics at Queen's University Belfast. During World War II, he was recruited from Queen's by MI6 to work as a code-breaker at Bletchley Park.

After the war he resumed studies at Magdalen College, Oxford. A lecture on feedback control by Norbert Wiener, regarded as the originator of cybernetics, proved to be a great influence on Foster's 
research.  Upon completing his PhD at Magdalen, he accepted an offer to lecture on his research at the University of Manchester, where he met Alan Turing, a Bletchley Park veteran who became known as the father of computer science. Turing introduced him to the Manchester Mark I computer and enlisted his help working on it. In 1956 Foster joined the faculty of the London School of Economics (LSE), first as an assistant lecturer in statistics, then lecturer and reader. In 1964, he was appointed to the chair of computational methods. While at LSE he helped develop operations research as an academic discipline.

Most noteworthy, in 1965 while at the LSE, Gordon Foster was commissioned by WH Smith, the book publisher and bookseller, to develop a computerised filing system as part of the publisher's drive to modernise its growing company. Gordon Foster developed for WH Smith, a 9 digit code which he named the Standard Book Numbering System (SBN). This code was very successful and was rapidly adopted by all UK publishers and booksellers. In 1970, the International Standard Organisation (ISO) expanded the SBN to 10 digits by adding an initial zero and the code was renamed to become the International Book Numbering System: ISBN.

The ISBN was born, and is now used worldwide by all publishers and booksellers.

In 1967 Gordon Foster was asked by Trinity College Dublin to start a Department of Statistics, and became professor of statistics at Trinity College Dublin. He promoted statistical analysis and computer applications in several constituent schools and academic departments. He fostered a lively forward thinking postgraduate and undergraduate program, with courses highly applicable to current statistical problems of the day. He also set up the Statistics and Operations Research Laboratory, known for outreach to industry and public services. He was elected a fellow of Trinity College Dublin in 1971 and Dean of Engineering and System Sciences.

Foster died in Dublin, 20 December 2010.

See also

References

External links
 
 Oxford Dictionary of National Biography
 Death Notice for FOSTER, Frederic Gordon

1921 births
2010 deaths
Academics of Trinity College Dublin
Irish mathematicians
Irish cryptographers
Irish statisticians
Cyberneticists
Fellows of Trinity College Dublin
Probability theorists
Systems scientists
Bletchley Park people
20th-century Irish mathematicians
21st-century Irish mathematicians